Tippecanoe County is located in the west-central portion of the U.S. state of Indiana about 22 miles east of the Illinois state line and less than 50 miles from the Chicago and the Indianapolis metro areas. As of the 2010 census, the population was 172,780. The county seat and largest city is Lafayette. It was created in 1826 from Wabash County portion of New Purchase and unorganized territory.

Tippecanoe County was formed March 1, 1826, and named for the anglicization of "Kiteepihkwana", a Miami people term meaning "place of the buffalo fish people." The county is best known for Purdue University, the 1811 Battle of Tippecanoe, and the Tippecanoe County Courthouse, a structure built in 1881 and included in the National Register of Historic Places.

Tippecanoe County is part of the Lafayette, Indiana, Metropolitan Statistical Area.

History 

The history of Tippecanoe County spans six distinct political and cultural periods: Native American lands from at least 8000BC, including the Mississippian culture, French occupation (part of New France beginning in the 1670s), British occupation starting in 1763, part of the United States Northwest Territory in 1787, part of Indiana Territory in 1800, and finally part of the State of Indiana in 1816.  The political organization of the county began in 1826 by the act of the Indiana Legislature.

The first European explorers arrived in the 1670s and the first permanent settlement was Fort Ouiatenon by the French established in 1717. Lafayette was platted in 1825 and Purdue University founded in 1869.

Geography 
The county's highest point is in the Lauramie Township.

Adjacent counties
 White County (north)
 Carroll County (northeast)
 Clinton County (east)
 Montgomery County (south)
 Fountain County (southwest)
 Warren County (west)
 Benton County (northwest)

Communities

Cities
 Lafayette
 West Lafayette (home of Purdue University)

Towns
 Battle Ground
 Clarks Hill
 Dayton
 Otterbein (east half)
 Shadeland
 Romney

Census-designated places

 Americus
 Buck Creek (formerly Transitville)
 Colburn (formerly Chapmanville)
 Montmorenci (formerly Bringham's Grove)
 Stockwell (formerly Lauramie)
 West Point (formerly Middleton)

Other unincorporated places

 Ash Grove
 Cairo
 Concord
 Delp
 Eastwich
 Glen Hall
 Monroe (formerly Huntersville)
 Octagon
 Odell
 Old Halfway
 Pettit
 Romney (formerly Columbia)
 Taylor

Extinct 

 Archerville
 Beeville
 Chauncey (consolidated into West Lafayette)
 Corwin
 Columbus
 Cincinnatus
 Clarksburg
 Cleveland
 Conroe
 Erie
 Florentine
 Fulton (absorbed by Lafayette)
 Gerard
 Granville (aka Weaton)
 Heath
 Harrisonville (consolidated into Battle Ground)
 Kingston (consolidated into West Lafayette)
 LaGrange
 Linwood (absorbed by Lafayette)
 Little Chicago
 Monitor (formerly Cynthyana)
 New Market
 North Crane
 Oakland (absorbed by Lafayette)
 Ouiatenon
 Polk-White Corners
 Prairieville
 Sidney
 South Raub
 Sugar Grove
 Sunberry
 Texas
 Wheeler's Grove
 Wyandot
 Yorktown

Townships 

 Fairfield
 Jackson
 Lauramie
 Perry
 Randolph
 Sheffield
 Shelby
 Tippecanoe
 Union
 Wabash
 Washington
 Wayne
 Wea

Climate and weather 

Average monthly precipitation ranged from  inches in February to  inches in June.

Transportation

Highways
  Interstate 65
  U.S. Route 52
  U.S. Route 231
  Indiana State Road 25
  Indiana State Road 26
  Indiana State Road 28
  Indiana State Road 38
  Indiana State Road 43
  Indiana State Road 225

Railroads
Three different railroad lines intersect in Tippecanoe County, all running through the Lafayette area.  CSX Transportation operates a north–south line; Norfolk Southern Railway operates a southwest-to-northeast line, and the Kankakee, Beaverville and Southern Railroad operates a daily-service line running from the northwest to the southeast.

The Amtrak Cardinal stops at the Lafayette Station 3 times a week, and is the only provider of passenger rail service to Greater Lafayette.

Airport
The county contains one public-use airport: Purdue University Airport (LAF) in West Lafayette, Indiana.

Government

The county government is a constitutional body, and is granted specific powers by the Constitution of Indiana, and by the Indiana Code.

County Council: The county council is the fiscal branch of the county government and controls all the spending and revenue collection in the county. The county council and the board of commissioners share legislative authority. Representatives are elected from county districts. The council members serve four-year terms. They are responsible for setting salaries, the annual budget, and special spending. The council also has limited authority to impose local taxes, in the form of an income and property tax that is subject to state level approval, excise taxes, and service taxes.

Board of Commissioners: The executive body of the county is made of a board of commissioners. The commissioners are elected county-wide, in staggered terms, and each serves a four-year term. One of the commissioners, typically the most senior, serves as president. The commissioners are charged with executing the acts legislated by the council, collecting revenue, and managing the day-to-day functions of the county government.

Court: The county maintains a small claims court that can handle some civil cases. The judge on the court is elected to a term of four years and must be a member of the Indiana Bar Association. The judge is assisted by a constable who is also elected to a four-year term. In some cases, court decisions can be appealed to the state level circuit court.

County Officials: The county has several other elected offices, including sheriff, coroner, auditor, treasurer, recorder, surveyor, and circuit court clerk. Each of these elected officers serves a term of four years and oversees a different part of county government. Members elected to county government positions are required to declare party affiliations and to be residents of the county.

Politics 
In the 2008 Democratic primary, Tippecanoe County was one of 10 (out of 92) Indiana counties to give the majority of its votes to Barack Obama. In the 2008 Presidential election, Tippecanoe County was one of 15 Indiana counties to give the majority of its votes to Obama/Biden. Thanks to the sizable support of Purdue University students, Tippecanoe County played a pivotal role in Barack Obama's upset win in Indiana (49.9%-49.0%; 1,367,264 votes to 1,341,101 votes) by supporting the Democratic ticket of Barack Obama/Joe Biden 55.1%-43.5% over the Republican ticket of John McCain/Sarah Palin. However, in the 2020 Presidential election, Tippecanoe County also voted for Democrat Joe Biden by a margin of 436 votes, the first time since 2008 the county went for the Democrats.

Historically, Tippecanoe has been somewhat conservative for a county dominated by a college town. While most such counties swung hard to the Democrats in the 1990s Obama's win in 2008 was only the fourth time it went Democratic in a presidential election since 1888.

Tippecanoe County is one of only thirteen counties to have voted for Obama in 2008, Romney in 2012, Trump in 2016, and Biden in 2020.

Demographics 

As of the 2010 United States Census, there were 172,780 people, 65,532 households, and 37,003 families residing in the county. The racial makeup of the county was 84.0% white, 6.2% Asian, 4.0% black or African American, 0.3% American Indian, 3.3% from other races, and 2.2% from two or more races. Those of Hispanic or Latino origin made up 7.5% of the population. In terms of ancestry, 27.5% were German, 13.9% were Irish, 10.8% were English, and 6.1% were American.

Of the 65,532 households, 28.5% had children under the age of 18 living with them, 42.4% were married couples living together, 9.8% had a female householder with no husband present, 43.5% were non-families, and 29.2% of all households were made up of individuals. The average household size was 2.42 and the average family size was 3.02. The median age was 27.7 years.

The median income for a household in the county was $47,697 and the median income for a family was $60,367. Males had a median income of $45,018 versus $31,995 for females. The per capita income for the county was $22,203. About 10.3% of families and 20.0% of the population were below the poverty line, including 18.2% of those under age 18 and 5.0% of those age 65 or over.

Education 
Public schools in rural/suburban Tippecanoe County are administered by the Tippecanoe School Corporation, while those in the cities are under either the Lafayette School Corporation or West Lafayette Community School Corporation.  Purdue and Ivy Tech each have campuses at other sites in Indiana.

Libraries
 Tippecanoe County Public Library
 West Lafayette Public Library

Universities and colleges
 Purdue University 
 Ivy Tech Community College of Indiana 

High Schools
 TSC - Elston Alternative Education Center 
 LCSS - Lafayette Central Catholic Jr/Sr High School
 LSC - Lafayette (city) Jefferson High School 
 LSC - Lafayette (city) Oakland High School 
 TSC - Lafayette (suburban—south) McCutcheon High School 
 WLCSC - West Lafayette (city) West Lafayette Junior-Senior High School 
 TSC - West Lafayette/Lafayette (suburban—north) Harrison High School 

Middle Schools/Junior High Schools
 Lafayette Sunnyside Middle School 
 Lafayette Tecumseh Junior High School 
 TSC (Harrison) Battle Ground Middle School 
 TSC (Harrison) East Tipp Middle School 
 TSC (Harrison) Klondike Middle School 
 TSC (McCutcheon) Southwestern Middle School 
 TSC (McCutcheon) Wainwright Middle School 
 TSC (McCutcheon) Wea Ridge Middle School 
 West Lafayette Junior-Senior High School 

Elementary Schools
 Lafayette Edgelea Elementary School 
 Lafayette Glen Acres Elementary School 
 Lafayette Miami Elementary School 
 Lafayette Miller Elementary School 
 Lafayette Murdock Elementary School 
 Lafayette (charter) New Community School 
 Lafayette Vinton Elementary School 
 TSC (Harrison) Battle Ground Elementary School 
 TSC (Harrison) Burnett Creek Elementary School 
 TSC (Harrison) Hershey Elementary School 
 TSC (Harrison) Klondike Elementary School 
 TSC (McCutcheon) Dayton Elementary School 
 TSC (McCutcheon) James Cole Elementary School 
 TSC (McCutcheon) Mayflower Mill Elementary School 
 TSC (McCutcheon) Mintonye Elementary School 
 TSC (McCutcheon) Wea Ridge Elementary School 
 TSC (McCutcheon) Woodland Elementary School 
 TSC (Harrison/McCutcheon) Wyandotte Elementary School 
 West Lafayette Cumberland Elementary School 

Private Schools
 Apostolic Christian Academy
 Concord School
 Faith Christian School
 First Assembly Christian Academy
 Highland Christian School k-8
 Lafayette Catholic Schools  k-12
 Lafayette Christian School  k-8
 Lafayette Faith Baptist 
 Lighthouse Baptist Christian Academy
 Pleasantview Christian School
 St Boniface 4-6
 St James Lutheran k-8
 St Mary Cathedral Elementary K-3

Economy
Much of the economy of Tippecanoe County is centered in its two largest communities: Lafayette and West Lafayette. Purdue University is by far the largest employer in the county, but private industry and commerce independent of the university also employ many others. Major employers include Subaru-Indiana Automotive, Wabash National, Caterpillar, Fairfield Manufacturing, Franciscan Health Lafayette, Alcoa, State Farm, and IUHealth Arnett.

Notable people
 Jesse Lloyd

See also
 List of public art in Tippecanoe County, Indiana
 National Register of Historic Places listings in Tippecanoe County, Indiana

Notes

References

Bibliography

External links
 Tippecanoe County official website
 Tippecanoe County Public Library
 Tippecanoe County Historical Association
 Lafayette Online
 Lafayette - West Lafayette Convention and Visitors Bureau
 GIS (Geographic Information System) for Tippecanoe County
 Lafayette Ski Club

 
Indiana counties
Indiana placenames of Native American origin
1826 establishments in Indiana
Populated places established in 1826
Lafayette metropolitan area, Indiana